Sondos (also Romanized as Sandas and Sendes, is a village in the Rudbar Countu, of the Gilan Province of Iran.

References 

Populated places in Rudbar County